A cuckoo filter is a space-efficient probabilistic data structure that is used to test whether an element is a member of a set, like a Bloom filter does. False positive matches are possible, but false negatives are not – in other words, a query returns either "possibly in set" or "definitely not in set". A cuckoo filter can also delete existing items, which is
not supported by Bloom filters.
In addition, for applications that store many items and
target moderately low false positive rates, cuckoo filters can achieve
lower space overhead than space-optimized Bloom filters.

Cuckoo filters were first described in 2014.

Algorithm description
A cuckoo filter uses a -way set-associative hash table based on cuckoo hashing to store the fingerprints of all items (every bucket of the hashtable can store up to  entries).
by cuckoo hashing are calculated by the following two hash functions
(termed as partial-key cuckoo hashing):

Applying the above two hash functions 
to construct a cuckoo hash table enables item relocation based only on fingerprints
when retrieving the original item is impossible. 
As a result, when inserting a new item that requires relocating an existing item ,
the other possible location  in the table 
for this item  kicked out from bucket  is calculated by

Based on partial-key cuckoo hashing, the hash table can achieve both high utilization (thanks to cuckoo hashing), 
and compactness because only fingerprints are stored. Lookup and delete operations of a cuckoo filter are straightforward.
If found, the appropriate lookup or delete operation can be performed in  time.
More theoretical analysis of cuckoo filters can be found in the literature.

Comparison to Bloom filters
A cuckoo filter is similar to a Bloom filter in that they both are very fast and compact,
and they may both return false positives as answers to set-membership queries:

 Space-optimal Bloom filters use  bits of space per inserted key, where  is the false positive rate. A cuckoo filter requires  where  is the hash table load factor, which can be  based on the cuckoo filter's setting. Note that the information theoretical lower bound requires  bits for each item.
 On a positive lookup, a space-optimal Bloom filter requires a constant  memory accesses into the bit array, whereas a cuckoo filter requires constant two lookups at most.
 Cuckoo filters have degraded insertion speed after reaching a load threshold, when table expanding is recommended. In contrast, Bloom filters can keep inserting new items at the cost of a higher false positive rate before expansion.

Limitations
 A cuckoo filter can only delete items that are known to be inserted before.
 Insertion can fail and rehashing is required like other cuckoo hash tables. Note that the amortized insertion complexity is still .

References

External links 

 Probabilistic Filters By Example – A tutorial comparing Cuckoo and Bloom filters.

Probabilistic data structures
Lossy compression algorithms
Hash based data structures